Japan competed at the 2002 Winter Paralympics in Salt Lake City, United States. 36 competitors from Japan won 3 medals, all bronze, and finished 22nd and last in the medal table.

See also 
 Japan at the Paralympics
 Japan at the 2002 Winter Olympics

References 

Japan at the Paralympics
2002 in Japanese sport
Nations at the 2002 Winter Paralympics